Fort Lupton may refer to:
 Fort Lupton, Colorado, a city in Weld County
 Fort Lupton (Colorado), a trading post around which the city of Fort Lupton was formed